The 2022 Chattanooga Red Wolves SC season will be the fourth season in the soccer team's history, all of which they've competed in USL League One, a league in the third division of American soccer.  They will play their home games at CHI Memorial Stadium in East Ridge, Tennessee. This will be their third season playing for manager Jimmy Obleda. Chattanooga Red Wolves are coming off of a 3rd-place finish from last season, the most successful season in the club's history at the time.

Club

Roster

Competitions

Exhibitions

USL League One

Standings

Match results

USL League One playoffs

U.S. Open Cup

References

Chattanooga Red Wolves SC seasons
Chattanooga Red Wolves SC
Chattanooga Red Wolves SC
Chattanooga Red Wolves SC